Oxbow Park and Zollman Zoo are a campground and zoo located in Olmsted County, Minnesota north of the city of Byron, and about  west of Rochester.  It houses over 30 species of animals, most of which have injuries that would prevent them from surviving in the wild.  All of the animals are native to Minnesota.  The zoo is named after Dr. Paul E. Zollman.  The most popular animals include a wolf, bald eagle, white-tailed deer, coyotes, bobcat, river otters, bison and cougar. Oxbow Park is open most of the year, as is Zollman Zoo, with a majority of the animals being visible year round.

History and development

The idea of a new park for Olmsted County was fostered by the Olmsted County Park Board and residents of the park area. The initial  of land were purchased in 1967. Located in the Zumbro River Valley, the area offered ideal recreational opportunities. A large bend in the river, called an “oxbow” because of its resemblance to an ox yoke, gave the park its name. This “oxbow” has been preserved through bank stabilization and now surrounds the main picnic area.

During the years since 1967, the park has been transformed from farm fields into a beautifully preserved area. A zoo was established in 1969 with the donation of native Minnesota animals from John Gilbertson, the regional game warden at that time. This zoo is now an integral part of park activities. A nature center, completed in December, 1981, is located near the zoo. This facility expands both programming potential and work capabilities at the park and offers additional exhibit areas for public use. The uniqueness of Oxbow Park is found in the amount of public participation and support it has received since its founding. The dedication of park visitors to its well-being has made Oxbow a favorite spot for many in southeastern Minnesota.

Oxbow Park

Park facilities include 4 different picnic areas, 6 separate picnic shelters,  playground equipment, and a 2-acre natural playground. All of the picnic shelters are available on a first come, first served basis. Each shelter has electrical outlets, a fire ring and nearby vault toilet. Reservations are not required and there is no rental fee for using a shelter. Nearly eight miles of developed trails wind through the prairies and wooded hills of Oxbow Park providing visitors with a variety of options for hiking. Oxbow Park is renowned for its splendid beauty and natural history. A hike during any time of the year promises to be a delightful experience. These trails are well maintained and marked for your convenience. Trail head maps are posted, and additional maps can be picked up at the nature center. Campers can enjoy a peaceful stay at the Oxbow campground. This area has 29 campsites available, with modern restrooms and showers. There are 10 electrical sites, 3 of these are ADA accessible. The campground has  playground equipment and is in close proximity to the natural playground and Zollman Zoo. Youth groups can utilize Oxbow's group camp for overnight and day camp activities for a nominal fee (inquire at park office). The park trail has plenty of Walnut, Maple and other flora

Zollman Zoo

The Dr. Paul E. Zollman Zoo houses over 30 native Minnesota animal species, including mammals, birds of prey, and reptiles. Most of these animals are permanently injured or are surplus from other facilities, and therefore can never be released to the wild. These beautiful creatures provide countless opportunities for learning and personal enjoyment, and are utilized in Oxbow's environmental education program. The zoo was named in honor of Dr. Paul E. Zollman, in recognition of his dedication to Olmsted County parks and his help in the care of the animals.  Zollman Zoo has become the center of Oxbow's education program. Thousands of students visit the zoo each year and participate in lessons offered by the park staff and volunteers. Public programs are offered on week-ends and evenings throughout the year, and provide nature lovers with a wide selection of activities. Topics and activities vary from season to season but all of them allow guests the opportunity to learn more about the natural world.

Across the road from the zoo proper lies the Gordon Yeager Memorial Area. The Yeager area features the zoo's large hoofed stock, which includes bison, elk, and white-tail deer. A restored prairie, pioneer home, and antique farm implement display offer guests a glimpse into our region's past.  The zoo offers children and adults alike a chance to observe some of the native animals of this area and to see, perhaps for the first time, some of the less common species. There is no fee required to visit the zoo, and many folks come out to “their” zoo time and time again. Each visit promises a new sight, a new experience.

External links
 Parks and Recreation, Olmsted County
 

Zoos in Minnesota
Protected areas of Olmsted County, Minnesota
Regional parks in Minnesota
Nature centers in Minnesota